The Bay of Love and Sorrows is a 1998 novel by David Adams Richards. It was adapted into a film in 2002.

Plot

Set in rural New Brunswick, Canada in 1974, the novel's protagonist is Michael Skid, the privileged son of the town judge. After a falling out with his friend Tom Donnerel, Michael befriends Madonna and Silver Brassaurd, a brother and sister who draw him into the orbit of Everette Hutch, a charismatic and violent man who ultimately leads the three youths to commit murder.

Adaptations
The novel was adapted into a 2002 film starring Peter Outerbridge as Everette Hutch, Jonathan Scarfe as Michael Skid, Joanne Kelly as Madonna Brassaurd, Christopher Jacot as Silver Brassaurd, Torquil Campbell as Vincent Donnerel and Elaine Cassidy as Carrie Matchett.

External links 

2002 films
Canadian drama films
English-language Canadian films
Films based on Canadian novels
Films set in New Brunswick
1998 Canadian novels
Canadian novels adapted into films
Fiction set in 1974
Novels by David Adams Richards
Novels set in New Brunswick
2000s English-language films
2000s Canadian films